Campeonato Brasileiro 2006 may refer to:

Campeonato Brasileiro Série A 2006
Campeonato Brasileiro Série B 2006
Campeonato Brasileiro Série C 2006

See also 
 Campeonato Brasileiro (disambiguation)

pt:Campeonato Brasileiro de 2006